Elaine Mazlish (31 March 1925 – 31 October 2017) was an American author, parent educator who wrote about helping parents and teachers to communicate better with children.

She also arranged various workshops based on the teachings in her books.

Early life and education 
Mazlish received a degree in theater arts from New York University. Before spending full time raising her three children she taught and developed drama programs for children in settlement houses in New York City.

Career 
Along with her co-author, Adele Faber, Mazlish was on the faculty of the New School for Social Research and the Family Life Institute of C.W. Post. Together, through workshops and books they disseminated the child-rearing philosophy of Dr. Haim Ginott.

Notable Works 
 Liberated Parents, Liberated Children: Your Guide to a Happier Family (1973)
 Siblings Without Rivalry: How to Help Your Children Live Together So You Can Live Too (1987)
 Between Brothers and Sisters (1989)
 How To Talk So Kids Can Learn (1994)
 How To Be The Parent You Always Wanted To Be (1992)
 How to Talk So Kids Can Learn at Home and in School (1995)

Death 
She died at the age of 92 on October 31, 2017.

See also 
 Adele Faber
 Dr. Haim Ginott

References

External links 
 Official Website
 Books authored as listed on Goodreads

Writers from New York City
1925 births
2017 deaths
New York University alumni